The 1947 Little All-America college football team is composed of college football players from small colleges and universities who were selected by the Associated Press (AP) as the best players at each position. For 1947, the AP selected first, second, and third teams.

First team
Back - Eddie LeBaron, Pacific
Back - Darwin Horn, Pepperdine
Back - Harold Bell, Muhlenberg
Back - Robert Hanlon, Loras
End - William Hart, Denison
End - Bill Iannicelli, Franklin & Marshall
Tackle - Ken Hubbard, Wofford
Tackle - Felton Whitlow, North Texas
Guard - James Nelson, Missouri Valley
Guard - Arthur Oley, Randolph-Macon
Center - Dan D’Andrea, Pacific Lutheran

Second team
Back - Ted Runner, Redlands
Back - Reed Bell, Sewanee
Back - James Batchelor, East Texas
Back - Carmen Ragonese, New Hampshire
End - Jay Smith, Mississippi Southern
End - James Burton, Wesleyan
Tackle - Ray Yagiello, Catawba
Tackle - Robert Hawkins, Evansville
Guard - Ben Coren, West Chester Teachers
Guard - Jack Ellison, Hardin-Simmons
Center - Paul Dietzel, Miami (OH)

Third team
Back - Henry Will, Newberry
Back - William Young, Hillsdale
Back - Henry Dombowski, Maine
Back - Phil Colella, St. Bonaventure
End - Jack Coleman, Louisville
End - Omer Jordan, West Texas
Tackle - Joe Lucas, St. Ambrose
Tackle - Jerry Cady, Gustavus Adolphus
Guard - Mike Reed, Louisiana Tech
Guard - Ted Andrus, Southwest Louisiana
Center - Myron Carman, Toledo

See also
 1947 College Football All-America Team

References

Little All-America college football team
Little All-America college football teams